Dawson is a city in and the county seat of     
Terrell County, Georgia, United States. 
The population was 4,414 at the 2020 census. Incorporated on December 22, 1857, the city is named for Senator William Crosby Dawson.

Dawson is part of the Albany, Georgia Metropolitan Statistical Area.

History
Dawson was founded in 1856 as seat of the newly formed Terrell County. It was incorporated as a town in 1857 and as a city in 1872. Terrell was an important site in the 1960s, when the county in which it is located was labeled "Terrible Terrell" by the SNCC. Jackie Robinson helped raise money to rebuild three black churches that were burned in the area.

In 1976, five African-American youths were charged with the murder of a white customer in a roadside convenience store. The crime and pretrial proceedings garnered national attention. The five young men, one of whom was a juvenile, charged in the case were known as "The Dawson Five". The court dropped the charges against the group of five; Roosevelt Watson, Henderson Watson, J.D. Davenport, Johnnie B. Jackson, and George Poor, when it found evidence of police misconduct, including coerced confessions, intimidation and improper identification procedures.

Geography
Dawson is located in Southwest Georgia  along U.S. Route 82 and  Georgia State Route 520 (Columbus Highway), which leads southeast 8 mi (13 km) to Sasser and northwest 9 mi (14 km) to Parrott. U.S. 82 leads west 21 mi (34 km) to Cuthbert and 47 mi (76 km) to Eufaula, Alabama. Albany is 24 mi (39 km) southeast and Columbus is 63 mi (101 km) northwest.

The city is located at  (31.773969, -84.440870).

Demographics

2020 census

As of the 2020 United States census, there were 4,414 people, 1,577 households, and 1,080 families residing in the city.

2000 census
As of the census of 2000, there were 5,058 people, 1,791 households, and 1,276 families residing in the city. The racial makeup of the city was 21.49% White, 77.26% African American, 0.06% Native American, 0.40% Asian, 0.10% from other races, and 0.69% from two or more races. Hispanic or Latino of any race were 0.93% of the population.

There were 1,791 households, out of which 34.1% had children under the age of 18 living with them, 33.9% were married couples living together, 32.4% had a female householder with no husband present, and 28.7% were non-families. 25.6% of all households were made up of individuals, and 10.8% had someone living alone who was 65 years of age or older.  The average household size was 2.76 and the average family size was 3.29.

In the city, the population was spread out, with 30.3% under the age of 18, 11.1% from 18 to 24, 24.7% from 25 to 44, 19.9% from 45 to 64, and 14.0% who were 65 years of age or older.  The median age was 33 years. For every 100 females, there were 83.3 males.  For every 100 females age 18 and over, there were 74.6 males.

The median income for a household in the city was $24,140, and the median income for a family was $25,511. Males had a median income of $26,006 versus $18,629 for females. The per capita income for the city was $10,752.  About 31.6% of families and 36.3% of the population were below the poverty line, including 49.8% of those under age 18 and 26.0% of those age 65 or over.

Climate
This area climate is characterized by warmer, humid summers and is generally mild to cold in the winters.  According to the Köppen Climate Classification system, Dawson has a humid subtropical climate, abbreviated "Cfa" on climate maps.

Education

Terrell County School District 
The Terrell County School District holds pre-school to grade twelve, and consists of two elementary schools, a middle school and a high school. The district has 98 full-time teachers and over 1,764 students.
Cooper-Carver Elementary School
Terrell County Middle High School

Private education 
Terrell Academy - Founded as a segregation academy in response to the racial desegregation of public schools.

Higher education 
Nearby Albany has three colleges to which students may easily commute: Darton State College, Albany State University, and Albany Technical College.  To the west, in Cuthbert, is historic Andrew College.  Also nearby is Georgia Southwestern State University in Americus.

Notable people
Lucius D. Battle (1918–2008), ambassador to Egypt
James Brazier (c. 1926–1958), African American murdered by police in Dawson
Erle Cocke Jr. (1921–2000) businessman, U.S. National Guard general
Wayland Flowers (1939–1988), puppeteer best known for his puppet known as "Madame"
Bessie Jones (1902–1984), gospel and folk singer
Dawson Five, five black Dawson residents who were wrongly charged with the 1976 murder of a white man; due to forced confession and other police misconduct, the case was dropped in 1977.
Benjamin J. Davis Jr. (1903–1964), attorney who defended man trying to organize a union from insurrection charges; elected as New York City Councilman after move to New York; Communist Party leader in 1930s
Robert J. Jones - Chancellor of the University of Illinois at Urbana-Champaign; former President of the State University of New York at Albany
Otis Redding (1941–1967), singer, songwriter, record producer, arranger, and talent scout, considered one of the greatest singers in the history of American popular music, soul music, and rhythm and blues.
Cole Swindell (born 1983) American country music singer and songwriter
Walter Washington - elected as first mayor of Washington, D.C. after the city was granted home rule by Congress

References

External links
Life and Death: Dawson, Georgia - 1977 - 27 minutes - WGBH Boston

Cities in Georgia (U.S. state)
Cities in Terrell County, Georgia
Populated places established in 1857
County seats in Georgia (U.S. state)
Albany metropolitan area, Georgia
1857 establishments in Georgia (U.S. state)